Nagaon district  is an administrative district in the Indian state of Assam. At the time of the 2011 census it was the most populous district in Assam, before Hojai district was split from it in 2016.

History

Bordowa was the birthplace of Vaishnavite reformer Sankardev, who brought about a renaissance in Assamese society. Located in Assam's heartland, Nagaon lies at the center of northeast India. The district dates to 1833. Its British administrators jocularly described Nagaon as a district of 3 C’s; namely: Chickens, Children and Cases.

The region was called Khagarijan in older records.

On 15 August 2016, the three tehsils of Nagaon district, namely Hojai, Doboka and Lanka were carved out to form the Hojai district.

Geography
The district headquarters are located at Nagaon. A part of the Kaziranga National Park is located within the Nagaon district. The district is bounded by the Brahmaputra river in the north (across the river is Sonitpur district, West Karbi Anglong district and Hojai district in the south, East Karbi Anglong district and Golaghat district in the east. The district is a perfect example oxoman (un-even in Assamese) (অসমান) from where the word Assam originated, as it possesses rivers, river valleys, hills, jungles and the plains.

Demographics
The population of Nagaon district based on the 2011 Indian census after separation of the newly carved out Hojai district is 1,892,550. Scheduled Castes and Scheduled Tribes make up 156,913 (8.29%) and 86,422 (4.57%) respectively.

Religion

According to 2011 Indian Census, the Muslims form a majority in the district with 10,63,538, with Hindus accounting for 801,181, followed by 1.15% Christians. Small populations of Sikhs, Buddhists and Jains also reside in the district. Way back in 1971, Hindus were in majority in Nagaon district with forming 59.6% of the population, while Muslims were 39.2% at that time.

Languages

According to the 2011 census, 77.17% of the population speaks Assamese, 16.75% Bengali, and 1.31% Hindi as their first language.

Economy
Agriculture is the backbone of the district and of Assam state. Rice is the principal crop and is the staple food. Fisheries are another major economy of Nagaon. In the village,a few brick manufacturing industries are opened ,where illiterate people work..

Culture
Many Namghars and associated templates are in Nagaon. These include the Bharali Namghar, which is situated in Hatbar and Borduwa Namghar. This namghar is situated in Nagaon Sattra, where Mahapurush Sankardev was born. Saubhagya Madhav, Dulal Madhav and Gopal Madhav are temples built during the reign of the Ahom King Shiba Singha.

Attractions

Bordowa

 This is the birthplace of Mahapurush Srimanta Sankardev (1449-1568) the artist, author, founder of Vaishnavism religion and dramatist. The two Sattras are Narowa Sattra and Salaguri Sattras. The mini Museum is there in Narowa Sattras

Champawati Kunda
  Champawati Kunda is a waterfall situated in Chapanala in Nagaon district.

Kaliabor
 Town that was the headquarters of Borphukans during the Ahom kingdom. It was the scene of several battles against the Mughals.

Silghat
 Silghat is a river port lying on the South bank of the Brahmaputra. Pre-communication links of Central Assam across the Brahmaputra traverse this port town. Silghat hosts the Assam Co-operative Jute Mill and several temples.

Raha
 Raha was an important Chowki during the Ahom kingdom. It became a trade centre for agricultural products such as paddy, jute and mustard. The Fishery Training College is there.

Kamakhya Temple
 The Kamakhya Temple is in Silghat. The Ashok Astami Melas held every year nearby. (This is not the Kamakhya Temple in Guwahati.)

Phulaguri
It is the place where Phulaguri Dhewa happened in the month of October 1861.It is said to be the first Peasants' Movement in the entire north-east India.It happened due to the exploitation on the peasants by the then British Government including exorbitant rate of taxes in various types of agricultural products.Captain Singer, a British officer was killed during the Dhewa & his body was thrown into the Kolong river nearby.

Kaziranga National Park
In 1974 Kaziranga National Park was established. It shares the park with Golaghat district. It is also home to the Laokhowa Wildlife Sanctuary. It covers an area of 70.13 km². Its main attraction is the great Indian one-horned rhinoceros. Other animals include tigers, leopards, Asiatic buffalo, wild boar, civet cats, leopard cats and hog deer. Various species of birds and reptiles are also found there.

Sports
Football matches are held in Jubilee Field in Nagaon.

Notes

References

External links
 District Administration website

 
1833 establishments in British India
Districts of Assam
Minority Concentrated Districts in India